Gustav Wilhelm Belfrage (1834–1882) was an American insect collector.

References

1834 births
1882 deaths
American entomologists
Natural history collectors